Northfield Ward is a 1-member ward within Kettering Borough Council. The ward was created as part of boundary changes in 2007 and was carved out of the part of the former St. Andrews Ward. The ward was last fought at Borough Council level in the 2007 local council elections, in which the seat was won by the Labour.

The current councillor is Cllr. Jonathan Vest.

Councillors
Kettering Borough Council Elections 2007
Gil Rennie (Labour)

Current Ward Boundaries (2007-)

Kettering Borough Council Elections 2007
Note: due to boundary changes, vote changes listed below are based on the 2003 result for St Andrews ward, from which Northfield ward was carved.

See also
Kettering
Kettering Borough Council

Electoral wards in Kettering